Promise of the Flesh is a 1975 South Korean film directed by Kim Ki-young.

Plot
A melodrama about a female prisoner who meets a man while on leave to visit her mother's grave. Not knowing that the man is a thief, she promises to meet him at a park two years later, after she is released from prison.

Cast
Kim Ji-mee
Lee Jung-gil
Park Jung-ja
Park Am
Jo Jae-seong
Han Se-hun
Yu Chun-su
Yeo Han-dong
Kim Chung-chul
Lee Yong-ho

Awards
Grand Bell Awards (1975)
 Best Actress (Kim Ji-mee)
 Best Supporting Actress (Park Jung-ja)

Notes

Bibliography

External links

1975 films
1970s Korean-language films
South Korean drama films
Films directed by Kim Ki-young